Hyainailourinae ("hyena-cats") is an extinct paraphyletic subfamily of hyainailourid hyaenodonts that lived in Africa, Asia, North America and Europe during the middle Eocene to middle Miocene.

Classification and phylogeny

Taxonomy
 Subfamily: †Hyainailourinae (paraphyletic subfamily) 
 Genus: †Megistotherium 
 †Megistotherium osteothlastes 
 Genus: †Mlanyama 
 †Mlanyama sugu 
 Genus: †Orienspterodon 
 †Orienspterodon dahkoensis 
 Genus: †Pakakali 
 †Pakakali rukwaensis 
 Genus: †Simbakubwa 
 †Simbakubwa kutokaafrika 
 (unranked): †Akhnatenavus clade
 Genus: †Akhnatenavus 
 †Akhnatenavus leptognathus 
 †Akhnatenavus nefertiticyon 
 Genus: †Hemipsalodon 
 †Hemipsalodon grandis 
 †Hemipsalodon viejaensis 
 Genus: †Ischnognathus 
 †Ischnognathus savagei 
 Tribe: †Hyainailourini (polyphyletic tribe) 
 Genus: †Exiguodon 
 †Exiguodon pilgrimi 
 Genus: †Falcatodon 
 †Falcatodon schlosseri 
 Genus: †Hyainailouros (polyphyletic genus) 
 †Hyainailouros bugtiensis 
 †Hyainailouros napakensis 
 †Hyainailouros sulzeri 
 Genus: †Parapterodon 
 †Parapterodon lostangensis 
 Genus: †Sectisodon 
 †Sectisodon markgrafi 
 †Sectisodon occultus 
 Genus: †Sivapterodon 
 †Sivapterodon lahirii 
 Subtribe: †Isohyaenodontina (polyphyletic subtribe) 
 Genus: †Isohyaenodon (polyphyletic genus) 
 †Isohyaenodon andrewsi 
 †Isohyaenodon zadoki 
 (unranked): †Pterodon clade
 Genus: †Kerberos 
 †Kerberos langebadreae 
 Subtribe: †Pterodontina 
 Genus: †Pterodon 
 †Pterodon dasyuroides 
 Incertae sedis:
 †"Pterodon" syrtos 
 Incertae sedis:
 †"Pterodon" africanus 
 †"Pterodon" phiomensis 
 †"Pterodon" sp. [DPC 5036] 
 Tribe: †Leakitheriini 
 Genus: †Leakitherium 
 †Leakitherium hiwegi 
 Tribe: †Metapterodontini 
 Genus: †Metapterodon 
 †Metapterodon brachycephalus 
 †Metapterodon kaiseri 
 †Metapterodon stromeri 
 Tribe: †Paroxyaenini 
 Genus: †Paroxyaena 
 †Paroxyaena galliae 
 †Paroxyaena pavlovi 
 Incertae sedis:
 †"Pterodon" sp. [BC 15’08] 
 †Hyainailourinae sp. [GSN AD 100’96] 
 †Hyainailourinae sp. [UON 84-359] 
 †Hyainailourinae sp. A [DPC 6555] 
 †Hyainailourinae sp. C [DPC 9243 & DPC 10315] 
 †Hyainailourinae sp. D [DPC 6545]

Phylogeny
The phylogenetic relationships of subfamily Hyainailourinae are shown in the following cladogram:

See also
 Mammal classification
 Hyainailouridae

References

Hyaenodonts
Cenozoic mammals of Africa
Cenozoic mammals of Asia
Cenozoic mammals of Europe
Cenozoic mammals of North America